Football is the number one sport in the Central African Republic. The national association has made conscious efforts to participate in all of the top international and regional championships. A 2-0 win over Ivory Coast in the qualifiers for the African Cup of Nations in 1972 still ranks as the nation's most significant success, although the return leg ended in a 4-1 defeat.

League system

References